Luger is a 1982 Dutch film directed by Theo van Gogh. The film was written and directed (his debut) by van Gogh and was filmed in black and white.

Cast
The lead role (Chris Luger) is played by Thom Hoffman who plays a psychopath with fascist tendencies.
The other main role is played by Laurien Hildering (her only acting credit).

Synopsis
The film is about the kidnapping of the mentally impaired daughter of a millionaire. The kidnapping is an attempt to get rich quickly by the main character. The father refuses, however, to pay the ransom.

Controversy
The film was controversial as it contained a scene in which two kittens were put in a washing machine.

External links 
 Luger in the Dutch Film Archives (in Dutch). It is reputedly the only copy left. It is on the playlist for the Dutch Film Festival in 2016.

Dutch drama films
1982 films
1980s Dutch-language films
Films directed by Theo van Gogh